A list of films produced in Italy in 2007 (see 2007 in film):

External links
Italian films of 2007 at the Internet Movie Database

2007
Films
Italian